The 1st Parliament of Antigua and Barbuda was elected on Thursday, 20 December 1951 and was dissolved on 5 October 1956.

It held its first meeting on 3 January 1952.

Members

Legislative Assembly 

* The Hon. J.L.E. Jeffrey, OBE, served as a temporary nominated member for 10 weeks starting 25 April 1952 during the leave that was given to the Hon. S.T. Christian.

Source:

References 

Parliaments of Antigua and Barbuda